Microspizias is a genus of bird of prey in the family Accipitridae. It contains the following species:

 Tiny hawk (Microspizias superciliosus)
 Semicollared hawk (Microspizias collaris)

Both species were formerly classified in the genus Accipiter, but a 2021 study found them to be strongly phylogenetically distinct, and thus described a new genus (Microspizias) for them. This was also followed by the International Ornithological Congress.

Etymology 
Microspizias derives from the Greek word micros ("small") and spizias ("hawk"), literally translating to "small hawk".

Taxonomy 
Phylogenetic evidence indicates that Microspizias is the sister genus to the lizard buzzard (Kaupifalco monogrammicus) of Africa and falls outside the Accipitrinae subfamily, hence why both species were moved out of Accipiter.

References 

Microspizias
Bird genera